Félix Vera (born 17 May 1961) is a Bolivian footballer. He played in three matches for the Bolivia national football team from in 1987. He was also part of Bolivia's squad for the 1987 Copa América tournament.

References

External links
 

1961 births
Living people
Bolivian footballers
Bolivia international footballers
Place of birth missing (living people)
Association football defenders
C.D. Jorge Wilstermann players
Club Aurora players